The 2008 FIBA Africa Women's Clubs Champions Cup (14th edition), was an international basketball tournament held in Nairobi, Kenya, from November 20 to 29, 2008. The tournament, organized by FIBA Africa and hosted by Kenya Ports Authority, was contested by 12 clubs split into 2 groups of 6, the first four of which qualifying for the knock-out stage.
 
The tournament was won by Desportivo de Maputo from Mozambique.

Draw

Squads

Preliminary rounds 
Times given below are in UTC+3.

Group A

Group B

Knockout stage

9th-12th place

Quarter-finals

11th place

9th place

5th-8th place

Semifinals

7th place

5th place

Bronze medal game

Gold medal game

Final standings

All Tournament Team

See also 
 2009 FIBA Africa Championship for Women

References

External links 
 
 

2008 FIBA Africa Women's Clubs Champions Cup
2008 FIBA Africa Women's Clubs Champions Cup
2008 FIBA Africa Women's Clubs Champions Cup
B
FIBA